The 1975 Denver WCT, also known as the 1975 United Bank Tennis Classic for sponsorship reasons, was a men's professional tennis tournament. It was held on indoor carpet courts in Denver, Colorado. It was the fourth  edition of the tournament and was held from 14 April through 20 April 1975. The tournament was part of the 1975 World Championship Tennis circuit, and was part of the Blue group circuit. Jimmy Connors made his WCT debut and won the singles title and the accompanying $12,000 first prize.

Finals

Singles
 Jimmy Connors defeated  Brian Gottfried 6–3, 6–4
 It was Connor's 6th singles title of the year and the 38th of his career.

Doubles
 Roy Emerson /  Rod Laver defeated  Bob Carmichael /  Allan Stone 6–2, 3–6, 7–5

See also
 1975 Majestic International

References

External links
 ITF tournament edition details

Denver WCT
Indoor tennis tournaments
Denver WCT
Denver WCT
Denver WCT